The British entertainment retailer HMV has operated a number of international subsidiaries during its history.

Japan 
In July 2007, HMV Japan, which operates 62 shops, was sold to DSM Investment Catorce. The stores and HMV Japan website continue to trade as HMV, but is no longer owned by HMV Group.

Since JVC Kenwood Holdings (through its JVC and Victor Entertainment subsidiaries) controls the His Master's Voice trademark in Japan, HMV Japan used a stylised gramophone of its own design as its trademark. As with the former U.S. and Canadian operations, HMV Japan's use of the initials "HMV" has never been challenged.

On 28 October 2010 the Japanese convenience store giant Lawson acquired all shares of HMV Japan from Daiwa Securities SMBCPI for ¥ 1.8 billion. KK HMV Japan became a part of Lawson, and was renamed KK Lawson HMV Entertainment (株式会社 ローソンHMVエンタテイメント) on 1 December in the same year. Terms of the deal were published on official websites.
HMV is known right now as HMV & BOOKS.

Defunct operations

Australia
In 1989 the HMV Group established its first Australian store in the Sydney suburb of Parramatta, closely followed by a second store in Chatswood in that same year. In 1990, HMV opened its flagship store in the Sydney central business district. The 1,207-square-meter superstore in Pitt Street Mall was the largest music store in the Southern Hemisphere and sold more CDs than any other store in the country. It was also awarded the ARIA Charts Store of the Year on three occasions. By 1998, a further 27 stores were opened in key retail centres on the eastern seaboard of Australia, including other large footprint stores at Melbourne's Bourke Street Mall and Brisbane's 585-square-meter Queen Street Mall store.

In March 2000, HMV made local headlines when their larger rival, Sanity, signed a five-year deal with Festival Mushroom Records for a three-year online exclusivity window on all tracks downloaded from that label at Sanity's website. Sanity's competitors and other online services were meant to be blocked from Festival Mushroom's catalogue for that period unless Sanity agreed to deal with them. Chaos.com and Leading Edge Music both made public threats to boycott Festival Mushroom's content, but HMV Australia (whose website did not offer downloading) followed through, removing all CDs from their domestic stores, adding they would do the same overseas. By the next week, Festival Mushroom backed down, stating Sanity would simply be the wholesaler of their digital downloads for the next three years, requiring them to make all products available to other retailers at the time of release.

In October 2005, Sanity's owner, Brazin Limited acquired the Australian operations of HMV for A$4 million (£1.7 million). The HMV Group's agreement with Brazin was to phase out the HMV brand in Australia by 2010. Immediately after this acquisition of HMV's 32 outlets, this put Brazin at its peak with its 74 Virgin Megastore and Virgin At Myer stores, in addition to Sanity's 215, and EzyDVD's 63 outlets around the country (not counting non-entertainment retail chains within Brazin, such as Bras N Things) and was by far Australia's largest entertainment retailer with close to 43% of the music retail market. However, most HMV stores in Australia had very high overhead costs due to their large footprints and expensive locations, thus most were gradually closed upon the end of rental leases. The remaining stores were re-branded to Sanity over the next five years. The horizontal merger was approved by the Australian Competition & Consumer Commission that same month leaving Brazin to merge marketing and general operations within the one entertainment division. Also in October, Brazin officially launched its Pulse loyalty card after a year of testing in the market. It worked by giving the customer one point for every dollar spent across Brazin's store network, receiving a $5 discount voucher or other offers once 100 points were reached.

By December 2006, HMV had already shrunk to 22 outlets from its peak of 32 the year before.

HMV's Australian flagship store in Pitt Street Mall closed on 31 August 2007, when the Mid City Centre shopping centre it was located in was closed for renovation, and the large Bourke Street Mall store closed on 19 February 2008. By mid-2010 the last HMV store was closed in Brisbane by Sanity, and the last re-branded HMV store trading as Sanity closed at Indooroopilly Shopping Centre in December 2012.

Canada

HMV established a subsidiary in Canada in 1988 following the purchase of Mister Sound by EMI Music Canada. In June 2011, HMV sold the business for £2 million to Hilco. As of 2012, HMV Canada had 113 stores. It remained a separate business to HMV in the UK, despite both companies being owned by Hilco. In January 2017 HMV Canada announced the closure of its last 102 stores, with a confirmed date of April 30 that year.

United States
HMV stores in the U.S. did not have rights to the His Master's Voice trademark; in those countries, that trademark is part of the RCA trademark portfolio owned by Technicolor SA and licensed to others. HMV was not prevented from using its initials in the U.S.

HMV had a handful of stores in the Eastern United States, which in their final years were overseen by HMV's Canadian operations. In the 1990s they had a significant presence in Manhattan.

Poor real estate decisions made in the early 1990s rendered the United States stores uneconomical and HMV gradually extricated itself from leases, and the final store in the United States, having lost £500,000 in 2003 and £1 million in 2004, closed on 3 November 2004.

Hong Kong and Singapore

In 1994, the first HMV store was opened in  the shopping centre Windsor House on 311, Gloucester Road, Hong Kong. HMV began opening stores in new shopping malls. The Tsim Sha Tsui flagship store, spanning 4 storeys at the corner of Peking Road and Hankow Road, was the largest record store in the territory until 2006, when it was re-located to another smaller location on Hankow Road. During the 2000s, HMV Hong Kong formed a partnership with Commercial Radio Hong Kong; one of their channels was renamed HMV864 and all HMV stores in Hong Kong tuned into that channel. The prices on their products especially those without promotion and discount are often higher than many independent record stores. HMV Hong Kong was the second place after the UK to launch in-store digital kiosks, and the first in Asia. HMV Hong Kong formerly used the same stylised gramophone logo as HMV Japan, but has since switched to the Nipper the Dog logo that HMV UK uses, but without the gramophone. At present there are four stores, plus a HMV-themed restaurant.

HMV was the second international music store established in Singapore, after Tower Records, which later closed down. It operates one store in Singapore, at Marina Square. The former store at 313@Somerset (which replaced one formerly in The Heeren) closed in November 2013, after closing the other at the CityLink underground mall. It is generally higher priced than other independent shops, and local chains such as Gramophone and That CD Shop offer lower prices. HMV is the only store that sells games, T-shirts, books and audio gear in addition to music and video.

Deloitte announced on 28 February 2013 that Hong Kong-based private equity firm AID Partners Capital Holdings had bought the businesses in Hong Kong and Singapore. In addition, the firm acquired the rights to the HMV brand in China, Macau and Taiwan.

HMV closed its last Singapore store in 2015.  In December 2018, HMV announced that it would close all its Hong Kong locations.

India
The first overseas branch of EMI was established in India in 1901. An important milestone was reached a year later, when it made the first audio recording in the subcontinent, of singer Gauhar Jan in 1902.

However, fortunes for the fledgling offshoot increased dramatically when the Indian cinema talkies exploded in popularity in 1931. This led to a surge in demand for film-based songs and soundtracks, and the company rapidly expanded production to cater to this new and growing market. Indeed, this music genre continued to grow year-on-year, and accounted for a sizeable share of its output for the life of the organisation.

The Gramophone Company of India was incorporated in 1946, and, in addition to fulfilling the needs of the home market, soon began exporting popular and culturally significant recordings around the globe - particularly to areas with large Indian expat populations. The company existed until 1985, when it was taken over by the RPG Group. On 2 November 2000, the company changed its name to Saregama India Ltd. Saregama controls a large repertoire of Indian film and non-film music, spanning a century.

Ireland
HMV Ireland operated physical stores and an online store in the Republic of Ireland up until 2016. The company's expansion into Ireland was part of the same expansion that expanded into Canada. Starting in the 2000s, all physical locations gradually closed down.

Italy
The Italian emanation of the HMV record label was La voce del padrone (Italian for "His masters voice"). From 1904, Gramophone Company records were published and distributed in Italy by Saif (Società Anonima Italiana di Fonotopia), a company based in Milan. When the Gramophone Company merged with Columbia in 1931 to form EMI,  Saif in turn merged with  Columbia's Italian arm, SNG (Società Nazionale del Grammofono).

References

External links
 HMV Canada
 HMV Hong Kong

Music retailers